Balthazar Philippe François Xavier De Beukelaer (27 September 1902 – 1 December 1944) was a Belgian fencer. He competed in three Olympic Games.

References

External links
 

1902 births
1944 deaths
Belgian male fencers
Olympic fencers of Belgium
Fencers at the 1924 Summer Olympics
Fencers at the 1928 Summer Olympics
Fencers at the 1932 Summer Olympics
Sportspeople from Antwerp